Yoel Sola Cariñanos (born 10 April 1992) is a Spanish footballer who plays for CD Izarra as a midfielder.

Club career
Born in Pamplona, Navarre, Sola made his senior debuts with UDC Chantrea in 2011 in the Tercera División. In the 2012 summer he moved to Segunda División B club CD Peña Sport, appearing regularly for the club and scoring seven goals.

On 16 February 2013 Sola agreed a deal with CA Osasuna, being effective in June. He was assigned to the reserves in the fourth level.

On 18 March 2015 Sola made his first-team debut, starting in a 0–3 away loss against Deportivo Alavés in the Segunda División. On 21 July he moved to CD Izarra, in the third tier.

References

External links

1992 births
Living people
Footballers from Pamplona
Spanish footballers
Association football midfielders
Segunda División players
Segunda División B players
Tercera División players
CA Osasuna B players
CA Osasuna players
CD Izarra footballers